The Chapel in the Wood is a chapel in the grounds of St Mary's University on Waldegrave Road in the Strawberry Hill part of Twickenham, London. The chapel is an example of early Gothic Revival architecture and is a Grade I listed building.

The chapel was built for Horace Walpole in 1772–74 and was in the grounds of his home, Strawberry Hill House. Subsequent building separated the chapel from the house, as the nearest parts of those grounds have been built on with what is now St Mary's University.

The roof is of slate and the front is of Portland stone, with a design inspired by a tomb in Salisbury Cathedral. Sir Nikolaus Pevsner described the blue and gold vaulted ceiling as "pretty".

Restoration and rededication
The chapel was restored in 1954 and rededicated to the Virgin Mary with a new statue from Italy and some new stained glass.

References

1772 establishments in England
Buildings and structures in the London Borough of Richmond upon Thames
Chapels in London
Churches in the London Borough of Richmond upon Thames
Gothic Revival church buildings in London
Grade I listed churches in the London Borough of Richmond upon Thames
Religious buildings and structures completed in 1774
St Mary's University, Twickenham